Henry IX is a 2017 British comedy series created by Dick Clement and Ian La Frenais, that aired on the television channel Gold.

Synopsis 

Henry IX (Charles Edwards), King of the United Kingdom and Head of the Commonwealth, is having a mid-life crisis, unhappy with his life and wanting to do more.

Cast 
 Charles Edwards as Henry IX, King of the United Kingdom and Commonwealth.
 Sally Phillips as Queen Katerina, Henry's wife.
 Annette Crosbie as Queen Mother Charlotte
 Pippa Haywood as Prime Minister Gwen Oxlade.
 Kara Tointon as Serena, the Palace florist.
 Gina Bellman as Lady Leonora, Queen Katarina's lady-in-waiting.

Other cast members include Colin Salmon, Don Warrington and Robert Portal.

References

External links 
 
 
	

2017 British television series debuts
2017 British television series endings
English-language television shows
2010s British sitcoms
Gold (British TV channel) original programming
Monarchy in fiction
Television series by Fremantle (company)